Martina is the seventh studio album by American country music artist Martina McBride. It was released in September 2003 by RCA Nashville. It was a number one on the country album charts and number seven on the US album charts. The album produced four singles on the country charts: "This One's for the Girls" at #3, "In My Daughter's Eyes" at #4, "How Far" at #12 and "God's Will" at #16. "This One's for the Girls", which featured backing vocals from Faith Hill, Carolyn Dawn Johnson and McBride's two daughters, was also McBride's first and only Number One hit on the Adult Contemporary charts. The album was certified 2× Platinum by the Recording Industry Association of America.

Content
The album features a live concert version of the classic song "Over the Rainbow". Track 2, "She's a Butterfly", features Big & Rich on background vocals. Ricky Skaggs plays mandolin and sings background vocals alongside his wife, Sharon White, on "Reluctant Daughter", which Skaggs also arranged. The track, "Wearing White", features Vince Gill on backup vocals. A limited edition was also released exclusively through Wal-Mart retail stores. This version featured a bonus track, "Show Me". The track can now also be found on Playlist: The Very Best of Martina McBride.

Track listing

Personnel 
As listed in liner notes.

Musicians and Vocals
 Martina McBride – lead vocals, backing vocals (2, 4), harmony vocals (3, 8, 10), arrangements (12)
 John Hobbs – acoustic piano (1, 2, 8, 10, 11), Hammond B3 organ (2-5, 7)
 Tony Harrell – synthesizers (2), Wurlitzer electric piano (8)
 Jeffrey Taylor – accordion (6)
 Jim Medlin – acoustic piano (9, 12)
 B. James Lowry – acoustic guitar (1-5, 7, 8, 10, 11)
 Bryan Sutton – acoustic guitar (1, 6), mandolin (1)
 Biff Watson – acoustic guitar (2-5, 7, 8, 10, 11)
 Marty Schiff – acoustic guitar (12)
 J. T. Corenflos – electric guitar (1, 3, 4, 5, 7, 11)
 David Grissom – electric guitar (2, 8, 10)
 Dann Huff – electric guitar (3, 4, 5, 7, 8, 10, 11)
 Paul Worley – electric guitar (10)
 Greg Foresman – electric guitar (12)
 Ricky Skaggs – mandolin (6), backing vocals (6), arrangements (6)
 Paul Franklin – steel guitar (1)
 Dan Dugmore – steel guitar (2, 4, 5, 8, 10, 11), 12-string guitar (4)
 Wayne Dahl – steel guitar (12)
 Glenn Worf – bass guitar (1, 2, 8, 10)
 Jimmie Lee Sloas – bass guitar (3, 4, 5, 7, 11)
 Mark Fain – upright bass (6)
 Glenn Snow – bass guitar (12)
 David Huff – drum programming (1, 3, 4, 5, 7), percussion (1), "big" drum (2)
 Lonnie Wilson – drums (1, 3, 4, 5, 7, 11)
 Matt Chamberlain – drums (2, 8, 10)
 Greg Herrington – drums (12)
 Tom Roady – percussion (1, 2, 10)
 Jonathan Yudkin – fiddle (1), mandolin solo (1), cello (2), viola (2), violin (2)
 Stuart Duncan – fiddle (6, 7)
 John Mock – penny whistle (1)
 Hillary Lindsey – backing vocals (1, 4)
 Big Kenny – backing vocals (2)
 John Rich – backing vocals (2)
 Wes Hightower – backing vocals (3, 10)
 Faith Hill – backing vocals (4)
 Carolyn Dawn Johnson – backing vocals (4)
 Aimee Mayo – backing vocals (4)
 Delaney McBride – backing vocals (4)
 Emma McBride – backing vocals (4)
 Sharon White – backing vocals (6)
 Vince Gill – backing vocals (7)
 Bob Bailey – backing vocals (8)
 Kim Fleming – backing vocals (8)
 Vicki Hampton – backing vocals (8)
 Troy Johnson – backing vocals (10)

The Nashville String Machine (Tracks 3, 5, 9 & 11)
 Chris McDonald – arrangements and conductor (3, 5, 11)
 Don Hart – arrangements and conductor (9)
 Eberhard Ramm – music copyist
 Bob Mason, Margaret Mason, Carole Neuen-Rabinowitz and Felix Wang – cello
 Jack Jezirio and Craig Nelson – double bass
 Monisa Angell, Jim Grosjean, Gary Vanosdale and Kristin Wilkinson – viola 
 David Angell, Janet Askey, David Davidson, Conni Ellisor, Carl Gorodetzky, Lee Larrison, Cate Myer, Pamela Sixfin, Chris Teal, Alan Umstead, Cathy Umstead and Karen Winkelmann – violin

Production 
 Martina McBride – producer
 Paul Worley – producer
 Clarke Schleicher – recording (1-5, 7, 8, 10, 11, 12), mixing (4, 6), string recording (9)
 Brent King – recording (6)
 Vance Powell – overdub engineer, vocal engineer, recording assistant (1-5, 7, 8, 10, 11, 12), recording (9)
 Erik Hellerman – recording assistant (1-5, 7, 8, 10, 11, 12)
 Lee Groitschz – recording assistant (6)
 Melissa Mattey – recording assistant (9)
 John McBride – mixing (1, 2, 3, 5, 7–12), management 
 Jeremy Cottrell – mix assistant
 Adam Ayan – mastering
 Paige Conners – production coordinator
 Astrid May – art direction 
 S. Wade Hunt – art direction
 Andrew Eccles – photography 
 Mary Beth Felts – make-up
 Claudia Fowler – wardrobe stylist
 Earl Cox – hair stylist 
 Bruce Allen – management

Studios
 Recorded at The Money Pit, Blackbird Studio and Paragon Studios (Nashville, Tennessee); Skaggs Place Studios (Hendersonville, Tennessee).
 Mixed at Blackbird Studio
 Mastered at Gateway Mastering (Portland, Maine).

Charts

Weekly charts

Year-end charts

Certifications

References

2003 albums
Martina McBride albums
RCA Records albums
Albums produced by Paul Worley